Sugar's Boogaloo is the debut album by the Sugarman 3. It was released by Desco Records in 1998. It was re-released in 2006 by Daptone Records.

Critical reception
AllMusic wrote that "fans of earthy, greasy jazz-funk and rare groove will delight in the fact that this music is being revived -- and in such danceable, soulful fashion."

Track listing
 Sugar's Boogaloo - 3:07
 Papa's Got a Brand New Bag - 2:58
 Sock Monkey - 4:05
 Sunshine Superman - 3:43
 Skunk Walk - 3:31
 Susie Q - 4:17
 Sweeth Tooth - 3:55
 Red Wine - 4:16
 Hot Sauce - 2:57
 Hankerin' - 4:31

References

1998 albums